The 1958 United States Senate election in Utah was held on November 4, 1958. 

Incumbent Senator Arthur V. Watkins was defeated by Salt Lake County Attorney Frank Moss in a three-way race that also included former Governor J. Bracken Lee running as an independent. This was one of a record twelve Senate seats Democrats gained from the Republican Party in 1958. Even in such a strong year for Democrats, Moss's victory in Utah was seen as a major upset.

Background
Utah at this time was seen as a safely Republican seat.  Utah had not elected a Democratic Governor or United States Senator since 1944. The state voted for Republican President Dwight D. Eisenhower by 17 points in 1952 and 29 points in 1956. It was one of only three states in the West which had trended towards Eisenhower in 1956, and the Republicans swept all congressional seats and state offices by substantial margins. The state had also not elected a Democratic Governor or United States Senator since 1944.

By June 1958, the state was considered the only "safe Republican" area in the entire nation. In the face of the national Democratic surge, one Republican expert was quoted, "I haven't had any bad reports from [Utah] — recently."

Republican primary

Candidates
 Carvel Mattison, attorney from Richfield
 Arthur Vivian Watkins, incumbent Senator

Results
Watkins easily won re-nomination by the Republican Party for a third term. Mattison carried only his home county of Sevier along with bordering Piute and Wayne Counties.

Democratic primary

Candidates
 Frank Moss, Salt Lake County District Attorney
 Brigham E. Roberts, Salt Lake City attorney and Democratic National Committeeman

Results

Independents and third parties

Independent
 J. Bracken Lee, former Governor of Utah

General election

Campaign
Senator Watkins made several key errors in the months and years preceding his defeat. He supported a strengthening of the Robinson–Patman Act, which angered business interests in the state and led the Utah Association of Petroleum Retailed to back Moss. The metal mining industry, which is a key part of the Utah economy, also grew dissatisfied with Watkins after Congress failed to pass favorable legislation. He also angered some rural voters by failing to take a side in a reclamation project that pitted development interests in Carbon County against those in Sanpete County.

Perhaps most importantly, Watkins angered conservative and right-wing voters within his own party by leading the committee which voted for the censure of anti-communist Senator Joseph McCarthy.

In the general election, Lee campaigned on the repeal of the federal income tax and a general reduction of taxes. He limited his previous criticisms of the Eisenhower administration and of the United Nations, though he continued to criticize foreign aid and federal spending in general. For his own part, Watkins campaigned on the issue of seniority. He claimed that if re-elected, he would be appointed to the powerful Senate Appropriations Committee. Lee responded by reminding Watkins that his predecessor, Senator Abe Murdock, was on this committee during his first and only term. Moss noted that seniority, even on a powerful committee, would mean little so long as Watkins's Republican Party remained the minority in the Senate.

Moss gained support by contrasting himself to the much older Watkins and Lee in a series of public appearances. At one such event late in the campaign at the University of Utah, Lee said that all politicians were corrupt. Given Lee's own long career in politics and many electoral campaigns, the crowd laughed. As Lee's campaign began to decline and Moss's surged, a number of high-profile national Democratic leaders came to Utah to campaign. They included Senators Lyndon Baines Johnson, George Smathers, and Warren Magnuson. The Moss campaign brought in AFL-CIO lobbyist Esther Peterson and local communications executive George C. Hatch to provide strategic advice and communications expertise.

In the final weeks of the race, the Moss campaign ran a double-pronged strategy: boosting Lee's appeal to Republican voters while drawing away his Democratic supporters. They first hosted a "Let's Sack Brack" rally featuring newly-elected Senator Edmund Muskie and Congressman John E. Moss of California. As Lee gained attention as the outsider candidate, he began to attack both parties equally as a single "machine." Watkins turned his attention to Lee and intensified his attacks. In the final weeks of the campaign, the Democrats carried out an intensive phone-banking operation, calling potential Lee supporters to claim that Moss was the only candidate who could unseat Watkins.

Watkins polled ahead for most of the campaign, but in the final weeks polls were published showing both Moss and Lee in the lead. Ultimately, his victory was credited to the presence of Lee in the race, which split Republican voters, and his own campaign's youthful energy.

Results

Results by county

See also 
 1958 United States Senate elections

References 

1958
Utah
United States Senate